Galloisiana is a genus of insects in the family Grylloblattidae found in East Asia. It contains 12 species.

Species
These species belong to the genus Galloisiana:

Galloisiana chujoi Gurney 1961 – type locality: Oninoiwaya Cave, southern Japan
Galloisiana kiyosawai Asahina 1959 – type locality: Hirayu-Onsen, Honshu, Japan
Galloisiana kosuensis Namkung 1974 – type locality: Gosu Cave, South Korea
Galloisiana nipponensis Caudell & King 1924 – type locality: Lake Chūzenji, Honshu, Japan
Galloisiana notabilis Silvestri 1927 – type locality: Nagasaki Prefecture, southern Japan
Galloisiana odaesanensis Kim & Lee 2007 – type locality: Mount Odae, South Korea
Galloisiana olgae Vrsansky & Storozhenko 2001 – type locality: Mount Olga, Russia
Galloisiana sinensis Wang 1987 – type locality: Paektu Mountain, PR China
Galloisiana sofiae Szeptycki 1987 – type locality: Mount Myoyang, South Korea
Galloisiana ussuriensis Storozhenko 1988 – type locality: Primorsky Krai, Russia
Galloisiana yezoensis Asahina 1961 – type locality: Miyazaki-Toge, Japan
Galloisiana yuasai Asahina 1959 – type locality: Tokugo-Toge, Honshu, Japan

Range and habitat
In Japan, Galloisiana species prefer rocky areas and cool, moist environments, where they are frequently found near streams (often under rocks) in well developed forests. Unlike the Grylloblatta species of North America, they are not known to forage in snowfields. They are most abundant in montane habitats in central Honshu. In central Honshu, Galloisiana specimens have been collected in the following mountains and mountain ranges.

Mahiru Mountains
Mount Funagata and Mount Zao (volcanic cluster)
Taishaku Mountains and Echigo Mountains
Mount Agaki (volcano)
Mount Haruna (volcano)
Kanto Mountains
Joshin'etsu Kogen Highlands
Yatsugatake (volcanic cluster)
Mount Myoko
Hida Mountains
Kiso Mountains
Chikuma Mountains
Akaishi Mountains
Northern Ryohaku Mountains
Southern Hida Kogen Highlands
Suzuka Mountains

Specimens have also been collected in Shikoku, which are genetically close to specimens from the Suzuka Mountains.

Diet
Galloisiana species are generalist scavengers that feed on both plant and animal materials.

References

Grylloblattidae